The ZVV (German abbreviation for Zürcher Verkehrsverbund, translated into English as Zürich Transport Network or Zürich Traffic Network) is a public transportation system. It combines rail, bus, tram, trolleybus, lake boat, cable car and other services in the Swiss canton of Zürich (and including Rapperswil-Jona (SG), Pfäffikon SZ and spots outside of the canton) integrating them into a single fare network with coordinated timetables.

Fares are based on the number of zones crossed during a specified time and are independent of the mode of transport or the number of connections.

History 
The system was established in May 1990 as a unified fare system with a coordinated local train network. Local train lines were prefixed with the letter S (S-Bahn). S-Lines 1 through 43 (with some lines missing) and now form part of the S-Bahn Network. A proof-of-payment fare system is in force on all S-Bahn trains. Fare gates are not used, but those caught without a valid ticket during a random inspection face a minimum fine of CHF 100.

Zones 
The ZVV system uses an integrated a ticket network. The zones are numbered 110–184; the numbers 180–184 designates zones outside of the canton's border. Passengers purchase a base ticket for particular zones. Upgrades and extension tickets are available as supplements.

Trips by fast trains and regional trains by any operator, such as ICN, InterCity (IC), InterRegio (IR), RegioExpress (RE), regional (R) lines, and even international railways are part of the fare network as long as they stop within the fare network's borders.

The zone system approach has been adopted by many other fare networks in Switzerland, such as libero (fare network) in cantons of Bern and Solothurn, and OSTWIND (fare network) in Thurgau, St. Gallen, Glarus, both Appenzells (AI and AR), and Fürstentum Liechtenstein.

For journeys just beyond ZVV's borders, some zones of the neighboring cantons' fare networks are combined within the extended fare network Z-Pass:

Aargau: Corridor A-Welle–ZVV
Thurgau/St. Gallen/Glarus: Corridor OSTWIND–ZVV
Schwyz/Zug: Corridor Schwyz-Zug–ZVV

Operators 
The operators that make up the ZVV are:

Aargau Verkehr
Busbetriebe Bamert
Dolderbahn
Forchbahn
Luftseilbahn Adliswil-Felsenegg
Polybahn
PostAuto Schweiz Region Zürich
Schifffahrts-Genossenschaft Greifensee (SGG)
Schneider Busbetriebe
Sihltal Zürich Uetliberg Bahn
Stadtbus Winterthur
Südostbahn (SOB) 
Swiss Federal Railways (SBB)
THURBO
Verkehrsbetriebe Glattal (VBG)
Verkehrsbetriebe Zürich (VBZ)
Verkehrsbetriebe Zürichsee und Oberland (VZO)
Zürichsee-Schifffahrtsgesellschaft (ZSG)

Leadership 
The current director of the ZVV is Dominik Brühwiler, appointed 1. January 2021. Dominik Brühwiler was Head of the Traffic Planning Department and Deputy Director for 13 years. Over 60 people applied for the position of Director and the Swiss Department for Transport picked him because of his past experience in the service.

See also 

Trams in Zürich
Trolleybuses in Zürich
Zürich S-Bahn

References

External links 
 

Public transport in Switzerland
Transport in Zürich
1990 establishments in Switzerland